Studius may refer to:

 Monastery of Stoudios, often shortened to Stoudios, Studion, or Stoudion, (Latin: Studium), historically the most important monastery of Constantinople
 Flavius Studius, founder of the monastery
 Studius (village), home of a castle captured in the siege of Constantinople